The NA60 experiment was a high energy heavy ions experiment at the CERN Super Proton Synchrotron. It studied "prompt dimuon and charm production with proton and heavy ion beams". The spokesperson for the experiment is Gianluca Usai. The experiment was proposed on 7 March 2000 and accepted on 15 June 2000. The experiment ran from October 2001 to 15 November 2004.

External links
 NA60 website
 CERN-NA-60 experiment record on INSPIRE-HEP
 Grey Book entry

CERN experiments
Particle experiments